Melissa High School is a public high school in Melissa, Texas (United States). It is part of the Melissa Independent School District in north-central Collin County and classified as a 5A school by the UIL. The school is located on the northwest edge of the city of Melissa. In 2015, the school was rated "Met Standard" by the Texas Education Agency.

Athletics
The Melissa Cardinals compete in the following sports:

State Titles
Football:
2011(2A/D1)

References

External links
 

High schools in Collin County, Texas
Public high schools in Texas